Shootout at Lokhandwala is a 2007 Indian Hindi-language action thriller film directed and co-written by Apoorva Lakhia and co-written and co-produced by Sanjay Gupta, with Ekta Kapoor serving as producer and Suresh Nair serving as writer. Based on the 1991 Lokhandwala Complex shootout, a real-life gun battle between gangsters and the Bombay Police, it stars
Sanjay Dutt, Suniel Shetty, Abhishek Bachchan, Vivek Oberoi, Arbaaz Khan, Tusshar Kapoor, Rohit Roy, Aditya Lakhia, Shabbir Ahluwalia, and Amitabh Bachchan in pivotal roles.

Overview

Aftab Ahmed "A. A." Khan, head of the ATS, attacked the Lokhandwala Complex on 16 November 1991, with a force of around 400 armed policemen. Dreaded gangster Maya Dolas was hiding in the complex. The leading protagonists in the film have slightly different names than their real-life counterparts, and the film caption is "based on true rumours."

Plot
The film opens with shots of brooms and dustpans cleaning dried blood, and cartridge casings in and around the Swati building at the Lokhandwala Complex. TVN reporter Meeta Matu (Dia Mirza) reports that some 3000 rounds of ammunition were discharged by a large police squad at a previously peaceful residential area.

The film moves to the office of former chief justice turned private prosecutor Dhingra (Amitabh Bachchan), who interviews the three leading members of the Bombay Encounter Squad: Additional Commissioner of Police Shamsher S. Khan (referring to A. A. Khan, played by Sanjay Dutt), Inspector Kaviraj Patil (Sunil Shetty) and Constable Javed Sheikh (Arbaaz Khan). The main film timeline is the extended interview of the three officers by Dhingra; as the officers answer Dhingra's questions, the film flashes back to show the incidents.

Dhingra asks about the Encounter Squad. Khan explains that he hand-picked 27 of Bombay police's best-enlisted men and officers. He borrowed the concept from the LAPD SWAT team to help combat crime. The film flashes back to show Khan selecting his men and putting them through intensive physical and mental training to be "fast, efficient and deadly." Dhingra is hardly impressed: he points out that if Khan "shoots to kill," he is no different from the gangsters he seeks to destroy.

Dhingra asks why Khan felt he had to do this. Khan explains that following Operation Blue Star in 1984, several Sikh terrorists fled to Bombay and began establishing a base in the city. They engaged in violence, extortion, and other subversive tactics to grow their operations. The film flashes back to show Sub-Inspector Mhatre (Abhishek Bachchan), a very brave officer and disciple of Khan, pursuing and subsequently getting shot down by a group of Sikh terrorists. Khan is deeply frustrated when the Bombay police, mired in internal bureaucracy and corruption, fail to act. He obtains clearance from police commissioner Krishnamurthy (played by the real A. A. Khan) and sets out after the militants. Khan asks Meeta (Diya Mirza) to cover the incident so as to deter future terrorists. True to Khan's words, he successfully "encounters" (it indicates summarily gunning down criminals; extrajudicial killings is the term accepted internationally) the terrorists who shot PSI Mhatre. (As per A. A. Khan, the encounter with Khalistani extremists was more dangerous and tough than the Lokhandwala Complex shootout.)

The film segues into the life of Maya (referring to Bombay gangster Mahindra Dolas though the film never mentions Dolas specifically; played by Vivek Oberoi). Maya is the second-in-command of the "big boss" in Dubai (a clear reference to Dawood Ibrahim though the film does not mention his name) and runs his criminal activities in Bombay. Maya recruits Bhua (referring to Dilip Buwa, played by Tusshar Kapoor) after successfully hatching a plot to eliminate Bhua's old gang led by Ashok Joshi. At this point, Maya and Bhua are at the top of Bombay's underworld, reporting directly to the big boss in Dubai.

Things heat up when Khan recognizes, through his network of spies and informers, that Maya is responsible for several criminal and possibly terrorist activities. Around this time, Maya's ambitions, fuelled by his mother's (Amrita Singh) insistence, grow to the point where he wishes to assert his independence from Dubai and take over Bombay himself.

Khan's ATS now focuses on eliminating Maya and Bhua, and begins a dangerous cat-and-mouse game where neither side shows any overt aggression but tries to disable the adversary by tactical maneuver. With the help of information provided by the informers, Kaviraj and Javed together kill Aslam Kasai who happens to be Maya's gang member. In order to force the gangsterd out of their hiding, Khan launches "visits" to the criminals' families to try to "persuade" them to counsel the criminals to surrender. In turn, Maya and his men return the "visit" by approaching the cops in social situations. Maya visits Khan at a restaurant where Khan is having dinner with his family. Maya quietly tells Khan that this is between his men and them and he should leave the families out of it. Khan retorts by saying that he did this to give him an opportunity to come clean but then it appears that any resolution hangs off the barrel of a gun.

Maya's rage intensifies when he gets thrown out by prominent city builder Wadhwani (based on real-life builder and politician Gopal Rajwani, owner of the building that the movie was set in). Maya had demanded 4  million protection money; Wadhwani claimed to deal directly with Dubai. Maya kidnaps Wadhwani's sniveling, overweight kid. When Wadhwani complains, the big boss asks Maya to cut it out and return the child immediately. Maya quietly informs the boss that he has upped his demands and that he wants to reign supreme in Bombay.

The film also explores the personal lives of the protagonists. Khan's wife Rohini, (played by Neha Dhupia) is unable to bear the constant neglect of his family life. She files for divorce but Khan is able to convice her otherwise. Patil's divorce is nearly upon him, too. In the enemy camp, Buwa has shacked up with a bar dancer Tanu (Aarti Chhabria), and is unable to spend any quality time with her. Fellow criminals Fatim a.k.a. Fatoo  (Rohit Roy); who's estranged from his parents and RC (Shabbir Ahluwalia); the character is plagued by ghost-like visions of an innocent family he gunned down) have similar troubles. The only members who are out of any personal trouble are gang leader Maya and a gang members named Doubling (Aditya Lakhia).

It all comes to a head in November 1991. The five criminals, including Maya and Buwa, secure themselves while holding Wadhwani's kid, in a flat at Swati building in Lokhandwala. Khan is tipped off of the location by an informant. (In Dhingra's questioning, Khan allegedly also received a call from the big boss in Dubai. Khan vehemently denies this.) Khan assembles a large squad of cops and lays siege to the location. He announces over the bullhorn that residents are advised to stay indoors and bolt their windows. Wadhwani's kid gets killed first when Patil mistakes him to be in Maya's gang.

A long and devastating gun battle begins. The criminals launch rocket-propelled grenades from their flat and try to escape. But they are overwhelmed by police fire, and all five criminals are eventually slain. The battle lays waste to the building: Film shots show the staircases, hallways, and several civilian flats completely pulverized by gunfire. Reporter Meeta Matu covers the action live.

Up to this point, Dhingra has been negative and denigrating of Khan and his efforts with the ATS. He cites press reports and civilian complaints that condemn Khan (and the ATS) of unilateral and unwarranted excessive force in a residential locality. Charges are brought against Khan and the ATS. But when Dhingra rises to defend them as their appointed counsel, he, in a surprising twist, presents an unconventional argument as a defence.

The film ends with Khan and the ATS being acquitted.

Cast

Production
Many scenes were shot on actual locations at the Lokhandwala Complex in Mumbai. There was a chase sequence with Sunil Shetty and Arbaaz Khan playing cops, and Ravi Gosain (Aslam Kesai) through Lokhandwala. It would have been difficult to shoot this sequence with the public around. Hidden cameras were used at five places, and the two actors ran 200 meters at the real location to can the scene.

Controversy
The film sparked much controversy regarding the fictionalised portrayal of the incident. Sikh groups complained about the wrongful portrayal of Sikhs as extremists. This led to Sikh groups wanting the film banned and "bitterly" opposing the film.

Soundtrack
The soundtrack for Shootout at Lokhandwala was released during April 2007 by T-Series.

Awards and nomination

53rd Filmfare Awards
 Nomination: Best Villain – Vivek Oberoi

9th IIFA Awards 
 Won: Best Villain – Vivek Oberoi
Won: Best Action – Javed Sheikh and Ejaz

2008 Star Screen Awards
 Nomination: Star Screen Award for Best Villain – Vivek Oberoi

2008 Zee Cine Awards
 Nomination: Zee Cine Award for Best Actor in a Negative Role – Vivek Oberoi

Stardust Awards
 Nomination: Stardust Award for Best Actor in a Negative Role – Vivek Oberoi
 Won: Stardust Standout Performance of the Year - Vivek Oberoi
 Nomination: Stardust Award for Best Music Director – Mika Singh 
 Nomination: Stardust Award for Best Playback Singer – Mika Singh

AXN Action Awards
 Won: Best Action film – White Feather Films
 Won: Best Action Actor – Sanjay Dutt
 Won: Best Action Actor in a Negative Role – Vivek Oberoi
 Won: Best Action Sequence – Javed Sheikh and Ejaz

Sequel

Director Sanjay Gupta (Director) confirmed a sequel of the film. In early 2012, it was announced that the sequel Shootout at Wadala would star John Abraham, Anil Kapoor, Kangana Ranaut, Tusshar Kapoor, Manoj Bajpayee and Sonu Sood. Abraham is featured as the lead protagonist gangster Manya Surve; Ranaut appears as his supportive girlfriend Vidhya Joshi, and Sood appears as Dawood Ibrahim.

See also
 Maya Dolas
 Dawood Ibrahim
 Aftab Ahmed Khan

References

External links
 

2007 films
2000s crime action films
2000s Hindi-language films
Films set in Mumbai
Indian crime action films
Films about organised crime in India
Indian films based on actual events
Films set in 1991
Films scored by Anand Raj Anand
Films scored by Strings
Films scored by Biddu
Films scored by Mika Singh
Films scored by Euphoria
D-Company
Fictional portrayals of the Maharashtra Police
Indian gangster films
Balaji Motion Pictures films
Action films based on actual events
Indian historical action films
Films directed by Apoorva Lakhia